Gareth John Evans (born 14 January 1967) is an English football player and coach. He played for Coventry City, Rotherham United, Hibernian, Stoke City, Northampton Town, Partick Thistle, Airdrie and Alloa Athletic. Evans has been the caretaker manager of Hibernian and Livingston, and was head coach of the Scotland women's under-19 national team for four years.

Career
Evans was born in Coventry and played for his local club Coventry City making ten appearances for the "Sky Blues" in two seasons before dropping down to the Third Division to play for Rotherham United. At Millmoor Evans played 39 times in 1986–87 scoring 11 goals as the "Millers" finished in a mid-table position of 14th however a poor season under John Breckin and Dave . saw Rotherham relegated to the Fourth Division. With Rotherham heading for relegation Evans moved to Scottish Scottish Premier Division side Hibernian.

It was at Easter Road where Evans enjoyed the most success in his career where he spent nine seasons. In total he played 301 matches for Hibs scoring 37 goals helping the Edinburgh side to lift the Scottish League Cup in 1991. In the 1990–91 season Evans spent time out on loan at Stoke City where he played seven times scoring twice, which came in a 1–0 win over Bolton Wanderers and in a 2–1 defeat against West Ham United in the Football League Cup. In the same season he also played twice for Northampton Town.

After leaving Hibernian in 1996 Evans continued to play in Scotland, initially signing for Partick Thistle. He then joined Airdrieonians in 1998 and Alloa Athletic in 2000.

Managerial career
After ending his playing career in 2004, he joined the Alloa Athletic coaching staff. He eventually became assistant manager, before taking a similar position at Brechin City, where he assisted former Hibs teammate Michael O'Neill. Evans then moved back into full-time football in 2007 by accepting the position of reserve team coach at Hibs. Following the departure of John Hughes on 4 October 2010, Evans was appointed caretaker manager at Hibernian alongside fellow coach Alistair Stevenson. Evans left Hibernian in November 2011, as new manager Pat Fenlon assembled his coaching staff.

Livingston appointed Evans as first team coach in July 2012. After John Hughes left Livingston to manage Hartlepool United in November, Evans and Richie Burke were placed in caretaker charge of the team. Evans left the club on 28 February 2013.

Evans was appointed as Scotland women's under-19 national coach in June 2013. He left this position in August 2017. He was appointed as Head of Youth by Hibernian Football Club on 24 September 2018.

Career statistics

As a player
Source:

A.  The "Other" column constitutes appearances and goals in the Full Members Cup, Football League Trophy, Scottish Challenge Cup and UEFA Cup.

As a manager

References
 Specific

 General

External links
 
 

1967 births
Airdrieonians F.C. (1878) players
Alloa Athletic F.C. players
Coventry City F.C. players
English footballers
Hibernian F.C. non-playing staff
Hibernian F.C. players
Living people
Northampton Town F.C. players
Partick Thistle F.C. players
Rotherham United F.C. players
Scottish Football League players
Stoke City F.C. players
English Football League players
Footballers from Coventry
Association football forwards
Livingston F.C. non-playing staff
English football managers